The eightbarbel gudgeon (Gobiobotia pappenheimi) is a species of small freshwater fish in the family Cyprinidae. It is found in the Yangtze and Amur basins in Asia.

References

 

Gobiobotia
Fish described in 1911